NHL 2Night is  a former news magazine that used to broadcast highlights of National Hockey League games and stories about the league up to five nights a week on ESPN and ESPN2.  It was usually broadcast live at 10:00PM ET or immediately following a game on ESPN2.  It was then re-broadcast a few times throughout the night and following day.

It debuted in 1995. The show was originally hosted by Bill Pidto and later John Buccigross. Barry Melrose was the main analyst.

Cancellation
The NHL and ESPN extended their broadcast agreement for the 2004–05 season, with options for the two following seasons. From a high of 129 game telecasts on ESPN, ESPN2, and ABC in 1999–2000, the new deal called for 40 games on ESPN2. As part of this reduced commitment, the network cancelled NHL 2Night.

ESPNEWS now provides expanded segments for Barry Melrose, usually on Thursday nights, to analyze NHL action.

After the NHL returned to ESPN in 2021, the network would announce a new hockey studio show The Point, the successor to NHL 2Night.

Personalities
 Chris Berman: Fill-in host
 John Buccigross: Lead host (1998–2004)
 Bill Clement: Analyst
 Brian Engblom: Analyst
 Ray Ferraro: Playoffs analyst (1999–2002); Lead analyst (2002–2004)
 E.J. Hradek: Insider
 Michael Kim: Fill-in host
 Bob McKenzie: Insider ("North of the Border" segment)
 Barry Melrose: Lead Analyst
 Eddie Olczyk: Analyst
 Dave Revsine: Fill-in host
 Mr. Ed: Horse
 Darren Pang: Analyst
 Bill Pidto: Lead host (1995–1998)
 John Saunders: Fill-in host
 Kevin Corke: Fill-in host

Segments
 Faceoff—The beginning segment of the show where the day's top news is discussed
 Take Your Pick—A segment where the host and analyst(s) pick who will win a certain game or series
 Eh or Neh—A segment where the host brings up a topic. The analyst must say if it will happen (eh) or won't happen (neh)
 2Night's Question—A trivia question asked at the first commercial break, usually relating to something that happened that day.  The answer was revealed later in the show.
 Highlights-Usually the bread and butter of any sports show, this one focused on the results of any given NHL game.

References

ESPN2 original programming
American sports television series
National Hockey League on television
1995 American television series debuts
2004 American television series endings